The Kingdom of Calontir is one of twenty "kingdoms", or regions, of the Society for Creative Anachronism (SCA), an international organization dedicated to researching and recreating aspects of the Middle Ages.

Calontir is located in the Midwestern United States and includes about 40 local SCA groups in Kansas, Nebraska, Missouri, Iowa, and (the Fayetteville area of) Arkansas. Calontir is bordered on the east by the Middle Kingdom, on the south by the kingdoms of Gleann Abhann and Ansteorra, on the west by the Kingdom of the Outlands, and on the north by the Kingdom of Northshield.

History
The name Calontir is believed by many to be Welsh for "Heartland"; however, that is incorrect. "Heartland" as a single word in Welsh would be "perfeddwlad." "Heart land" as two words more closely resembles "Calontir;" it translated into Welsh as "tir y galon" or "Calondir." Over time the error has become common usage.  It began as a principality within the Middle Kingdom in 1981-2 (AS XVI in the SCA's own calendar) and on February 18, 1984  (AS XVIII) became the tenth kingdom of the SCA. The first king and queen of Calontir were known as Chepe l’Orageux and Arwyn Antaradi.

The arms of the kingdom, registered January 1984, are: Purpure, a cross of Calatrava, in chief a crown, within in bordure a laurel wreath Or.

Culture
Calontir has a distinctive cultural flavor, as does each kingdom in the SCA. Calontir is known for its cohesive presence at war, every individual in the Calontir army dressed in the kingdom's livery (purple with a golden falcon) and fighting in a huge shield wall, units marching into battle singing in unison, as if "a kingdom that runs like a household." This cohesiveness may be influenced by traditional attitudes on the Great Plains, where strong communities have evolved out of farmers' cooperatives, formed long ago to ensure mutual survival against the elements of the American frontier.

Drawing on its name and the culture of its founding group, Calontir is often associated with pre-Conquest England, an identity reflected in many of its songs, which convey the perspective of the downtrodden more often than the triumphant.  This focus on pre-12th century England may have been a factor in Calontir's distinction as the last kingdom in the SCA to recognize SCA fencing.

Events

Local groups in Calontir, as in other SCA kingdoms, host local and kingdom-level events throughout the year, which include SCA combat tournaments, Arts and Sciences competitions, seasonal feasts, etc. The Kingdom of Calontir annually hosts the War of the Lilies, a nine-day camping event each June, which in recent years has attracted about a thousand SCA members for combat and other activities. The first Lilies War was held in 1987 at Perry Lake in Kansas.  Since 1992, the event has been held at Smithville Lake in Missouri. Unlike most SCA wars, which exploit inter-kingdom rivalries, Lilies War is a themed event, the contending groups based upon the theme of the year. According to the Lilies War Committee charter, "the theme may not place the Kingdom of Calontir against another group".  Some of the events that take place are armored combat, archery, Arts and Sciences demonstrations and competitions, classes, feasting, games, youth activities, and shopping in the period markets and food court. Kingdom-level events in Calontir include the Kingdom Arts and Sciences Competition, the Queen's Prize Arts and Sciences Tournament, various symposia (Clothier's Seminar, Cooking Symposium, etc.), and combat tournaments such as the semi-annual Crown Tournament (which decide the future heirs to the crown).

Local groups 

In the SCA, a barony is the largest type of local group, usually arising in areas of dense population and requiring a core of at least 25 paid, active members (though more people may participate occasionally or not become paid members).  Baronies are run by a baron and baroness, who represent the king and queen.  Calontir has six baronies:
Barony of Forgotten Sea (Kansas City metropolitan area):  Founded as a shire of the Middle Kingdom in November 1976 after an earlier group (the Shire of the Fountains) had disbanded, Forgotten Sea became a barony on February 10, 1979.  They are home to Calontir's first female knight, Ariel of Glastonbury Tor, who has also reigned three times as Queen of Calontir.
Barony of the Lonely Tower (Omaha, Nebraska):  Lonely Tower was founded as a shire of the Middle Kingdom in July 1979 and became a barony on June 21, 1986.
Barony of the Three Rivers (St. Louis, Missouri):  The second SCA group in St. Louis by that name (an earlier one, now known as the "Lost Colony of Three Rivers", had disbanded), Three Rivers was founded as a shire in 1975; when it was created a barony on May 27, 1978, it was the first barony in what would become Calontir, and also the only one until Forgotten Sea became a barony in 1979. 
Barony of Coeur d'Ennui (Des Moines, Iowa):  Founded as a shire of the Middle Kingdom in October, 1982, Coeur d'Ennui became a barony of Calontir in July, 1984.
Barony of Mag Mor (Lincoln, Nebraska):  Mag Mor was founded as a shire of the Middle Kingdom in October 1982.    Still a shire at the time, they hosted the coronation of the first king and queen of Calontir in 1984.  Mag Mor became a barony in January 1996.
Barony of Vatavia (Wichita, Kansas):  Vatavia began as a shire in January, 1983, and became a barony of Middle Kingdom in August, 1983.

The Barony of Dumnonia was founded in Iowa City, Iowa in December 1975, but became defunct before the founding of Calontir.  The Iowa City area is now home to the Shire of Shadowdale.
 
The typical local SCA group, somewhat smaller than a barony, is a shire.  There are 19 shires in Calontir and one shire-march (a shire on the border between two kingdoms), called Grimfells, which is in the Fayetteville, Arkansas area.  Colleges are similar to shires but located in areas with large student populations;  Calontir has two colleges (Bellewode in Kirksville, Missouri and No Mountain in Grinnell, Iowa).  It also has three cantons, which are "fiefdoms" of a barony distant enough to be able to have meetings and events of their own but close enough to not be independent shires, and several unofficial local contacts in areas with too small a membership to form an official group.

See also
Society for Creative Anachronism activities
SCA heavy combat
The West Kingdom
Kingdom of Lochac
Kingdom of the Outlands

External links
 Kingdom of Calontir official website
 History of Calontir by SCA member Master Crag Duggan
 Geography of Calontir(PDF) listing of locations of local groups in Calontir
 Map of Calontir(PDF) (by Modar)
 Lilies War XXVII (2013)

References

Medieval reenactment
Society for Creative Anachronism